Mortimer P. Gallivan (February 27, 1914 – August 28, 1990) was an American politician who served in the New York State Assembly from 1966 to 1970.

He died on August 28, 1990, in Syracuse, New York at age 76.

References

1914 births
1990 deaths
Democratic Party members of the New York State Assembly
20th-century American politicians